Cheese Mites, or Lilliputians in a London Restaurant is a 1901 British short  silent comedy film, directed by Walter R. Booth, featuring a gentleman being entertained by the little people who emerge from the cheese at his table. The film, "contains a reference to Jonathan Swift's satirical novel Gulliver's Travels (1726)," and is, according to Michael Brooke of BFI Screenonline, "sophisticated in that he combined the jump-cut with superimposition."

References

External links

Walthamstow Caribbean restaurant 

1901 films
British black-and-white films
British silent short films
1901 comedy films
1901 short films
Articles containing video clips
British comedy short films
Films directed by Walter R. Booth
Silent comedy films